Stephen M. Hawley (born  1947) is a Republican member of the New York State Assembly. He represents Assembly District 139, which comprises portions of Genesee, Monroe, Niagara, and Orleans counties.

Hawley is a native of Batavia, New York, and graduated from Batavia High School in 1965, where he was a classmate of future journalist Terry A. Anderson.

He earned a B.S. degree in education from the University of Toledo and served seven years in the Ohio Army National Guard and the United States Army Reserve where he earned the rank of 1st Lieutenant.

A realtor and insurance agent by trade, he is the current co-owner, with his wife, of the Stephen M. Hawley Insurance Center in Batavia. He previously owned and operated Hawley Farms. He also served on the Genesee County Legislature.

Hawley was first elected to the State Assembly in a special election on February 28, 2006. He ran uncontested in the November 2008 general election and won the November 2010 general election with 79 percent of the vote.

Hawley and his wife Crystal reside in the Town of Batavia and have four sons: Brooks, Dan, Tim, and Cooper. Hawley is the son of former Assembly member R. Stephen Hawley and the late Ellen Hawley.

Election results
 February 2006 special election, NYS Assembly, 139th AD
{| class="Wikitable"
| Stephen M. Hawley (REP - IND - CON) || ... || 6,250
| Gary F. Kent (DEM) || ... || 3,428
|}

 November 2006 general election, NYS Assembly, 139th AD
{| class="Wikitable"
| Stephen M. Hawley (REP - IND - CON) || ... || 23,503
| Gary F. Kent (DEM - WOR) || ... || 12,096
|}

 November 2008 general election, NYS Assembly, 139th AD
{| class="Wikitable"
| Stephen M. Hawley (REP - IND - CON) || ... || 34,932
|}

 November 2010 general election, NYS Assembly, 139th AD
{| class="Wikitable"
| Stephen M. Hawley (REP - IND - CON) || ... || 27,384
| Christopher M. Barons (DEM) || ... || 7,426
|}

 November 2012 general election, NYS Assembly, 139th AD
{| class="Wikitable"
| Stephen M. Hawley (REP - IND - CON) || ... || 39,886
| Mark E. Glogowski (LIB) || ... || 2,919
|}

 November 2014 general election, NYS Assembly, 139th AD
{| class="Wikitable"
| Stephen M. Hawley (REP - IND - CON) || ... || 29,170
| Mark E. Glogowski (LIB) || ... || 1,363
|}

References

External links
New York State Assembly Member Website

1940s births
Living people
Republican Party members of the New York State Assembly
People from Batavia, New York
University of Toledo alumni
21st-century American politicians